Ippolito Rotoli (2 September 1914 – 4 October 1977) was an Italian prelate of the Catholic Church who worked in the diplomatic service of the Holy See. He became an archbishop in 1967 and from then until his death served as an Apostolic Nuncio.

Biography
Ippolito Rotoli was born on 2 September 1914 in Sezze Romano, Italy. He was ordained a priest on 20 June 1937.

To prepare for a diplomatic career he entered the Pontifical Ecclesiastical Academy in 1944.

On 2 September 1967, Pope Paul VI named him titular archbishop of Thibiuca and Apostolic Pro-Nuncio to Korea. 

He received his episcopal consecration in 8 December 1967 from Cardinal Amleto Cicognani.

On 17 November 1972 Pope Paul appointed him Apostolic Pro-Nuncio to Ethiopia. 

On 10 January 1974, Pope Paul named him Apostolic Pro-Nuncio to Japan.

He died on 4 October 1977.

References

External links 
Catholic Hierarchy: Archbishop Ippolito Rotoli  

1914 births
People from the Province of Latina
Apostolic Nuncios to South Korea
Apostolic Nuncios to Ethiopia
Apostolic Nuncios to Japan
1977 deaths